Roger John Laugharne Thomas, Baron Thomas of Cwmgiedd,  (born Carmarthen, 22 October 1947) is a British judge. He served as Lord Chief Justice of England and Wales from 2013 to 2017.

Early life and education
Thomas was born in 1947 to Roger Edward Laugharne Thomas and his wife Dinah Agnes Thomas, of Cwmgiedd.

Thomas was educated at Rugby School and Trinity Hall, Cambridge, where he graduated B.A. in Law in 1966. He was elected a Fellow of Trinity Hall in 2004. He proceeded to the University of Chicago where he earned a J.D. degree and was a Commonwealth Fellow.

Thomas was an assistant teacher at Mayo College, Ajmer, India, from 1965 to 1966.

Legal career
Thomas was called to the Bar in 1969 (Gray's Inn). He was elected a Bencher in 1992. He commenced practice in 1972, became a Queen's Counsel in 1984 and was appointed a Recorder in 1987. He practiced as a member of the commercial chambers at 4 Essex Court in the Temple, which in 1994 moved to Lincoln's Inn Fields and has since then been known as Essex Court Chambers.

In 1992 he was appointed by the Department of Trade and Industry as an Inspector into the affairs of Mirror Group Newspapers plc (when it was owned by Robert Maxwell) and its IPO.

On 11 January 1996, he was appointed a High Court judge, receiving the customary knighthood, and was assigned to the Queen's Bench Division, serving on the Commercial Court until his appointment to the Court of Appeal. From 1998 to 2001 he was a Presiding Judge of the Wales and Chester Circuit. On 14 July 2003, Thomas became a Lord Justice of Appeal and given the customary appointment to the Privy Council later that year. He served as the Senior Presiding Judge from 2003 to 2006, and President of the European Network of Councils for the Judiciary from 2008 to 2010, having participated in its founding in 2003–2004.

In October 2008, Thomas was appointed Vice-President of the Queen's Bench Division and Deputy Head of Criminal Justice. On 3 October 2011, he succeeded Sir Anthony May as President of the Queen's Bench Division.

Promotion to Lord Chief Justice

On 1 October 2013, Thomas was appointed to succeed Lord Judge as Lord Chief Justice of England and Wales. On 26 September 2013, it was announced Thomas would become a life peer upon taking office as Lord Chief Justice. He was created a Life Peer on 4 October 2013, taking the title Baron Thomas of Cwmgiedd, of Cwmgiedd in the County of Powys. Following his introduction, as a serving member of the judiciary he was immediately disqualified from sitting in the House of Lords under section 137(3) of the Constitutional Reform Act 2005.

Other affiliations

He was appointed by the Government of Wales in September 2017 to chair a Commission on Justice in Wales. Commissioners were appointed in November 2017. The commission undertook a review of the justice system in Wales (for December 2017 - October 2019) and published its report in October 2019. The report "set a long term vision for the future of justice in Wales".

Thomas is one of the Founding Members of the European Law Institute, a non-profit organisation that conducts research, makes recommendations and provides practical guidance in the field of European legal development.  He is a member of its Executive Committee.

His disqualification from sitting in the House of Lords ceased on his retirement as Lord Chief Justice. He is a member of the EU Financial Affairs Sub-Committee and chaired the Middle Level Bill Committee in 2018.

He is an Honorary Fellow of Trinity Hall, Cambridge and a Fellow of the Universities of Cardiff, Aberystwyth, Swansea and Bangor and an Honorary Doctor of Law of the Universities of South Wales, the West of England, Wales and of Cardiff Metropolitan University. He is a Fellow of the Learned Society of Wales.

He has been Chancellor of Aberystwyth University since January 2018.

He was appointed Chairman of the Financial Markets Law Committee in November 2017. He returned to Essex Court Chambers in November 2017 and joined the Arbitrators at 24 Lincoln's Inn Fields.  He was a founder of the AIDA Reinsurance and Insurance Arbitration Society in 1991 and is its president.

Personal life
In 1973, he married Elizabeth Ann Buchanan, daughter of S J Buchanan of Ohio, US. They have one son and one daughter.

He lists his recreations in Who's Who as gardens, walking and travel.

Arms

See also
List of Lords Justices of Appeal

References

1947 births
Knights Bachelor
People educated at Rugby School
20th-century King's Counsel
17th-century Welsh judges
Presidents of the Queen's Bench Division
Lords Justices of Appeal
Lord chief justices of England and Wales
Crossbench life peers
Alumni of Trinity Hall, Cambridge
Fellows of Trinity Hall, Cambridge
Members of the Privy Council of the United Kingdom
Members of Gray's Inn
University of Chicago Law School alumni
Living people
20th-century Welsh lawyers
21st-century English judges
Place of birth missing (living people)
Welsh King's Counsel
Life peers created by Elizabeth II